The Governor of Chernihiv Oblast is the head of executive branch for the Chernihiv Oblast.

The office of Governor is an appointed position, with officeholders being appointed by the President of Ukraine, on recommendation from the Prime Minister of Ukraine.

The official residence for the Governor is located in Chernihiv. The current Governor is Viacheslav Chaus, who was appointed on 4 August 2021 by President Volodymyr Zelenskyy.

Governors

Representative of the President
 1992 – 1994 Valentyn Melnychuk

Chairman of the Executive Committee
 1994 – 1995 Petro Shapoval

Heads of the Administration
 1995 – 1998 Petro Shapoval
 1998 – 1999 Mykhailo Kaskevych
 1999 – 2002 Mykola Butko
 2002 – 2002 Hryhoriy Panchenko (acting)
 2002 – 2005 Valentyn Melnychuk
 2005 – 2005 Vladyslav Atroshenko
 2005 – 2007 Mykola Lavryk
 2007 – 2014 Volodymyr Khomenko (acting since 12 October 2007)
 2014 – 2014 Volodymyr Ivashko
 2014 – 2015 Serhiy Zhurman
 2015 – 2018 Valeriy Kulich
 2018 - 2018 Yulia Svyrydenko (acting)
 2018 – 2019 Oleksandr Mysnyk
 2019 – 2019 Nataliia Romanova (acting)
 2019 – 2020 Andrii Prokopenko
 2020 – 2021 Anna Kovalenko
 2021 – incumbent Vyacheslav Chaus

References

External links
Government of Chernihiv Oblast in Ukrainian
Chernihiv at the World Statesmen.org

 
Chernihiv Oblast